{{DISPLAYTITLE:Peanuts animated specials}}

The successful comic strip Peanuts, by Charles M. Schulz, was adapted into 46 animated specials since 1965, most of them released on television. This article describes the history of these programs, including notable sponsors, directors, and voice actors.

History
In the strip, adult voices are heard, though conversations are usually only depicted from the children's end. To translate this aspect to the animated medium, the sound of a trombone with a solotone mute (created by Vince Guaraldi played by Dean Hubbard.

Eight Peanuts-based specials have been made posthumously. Of these, three are tributes to Peanuts or other Peanuts specials, and five are completely new specials based on dialogue from the strips and ideas given to ABC by Schulz before his death. He's a Bully, Charlie Brown, was telecast on ABC on November 20, 2006, following a repeat broadcast of A Charlie Brown Thanksgiving. Airing 43 years after the first special, the premiere of He's a Bully, Charlie Brown was watched by nearly 10 million viewers, winning its time slot and beating a Madonna concert special.

In October 2007, Warner Bros. acquired the Peanuts catalog from Paramount for an undisclosed amount of money. As aforementioned, they now hold the worldwide distribution rights for all Peanuts properties including over 50 television specials—these are originally managed by Warner Bros. Television and Warner Bros. Television Animation. Warner has made plans to develop new specials for television as well as the direct to video market, as well as short subjects for digital distribution, and some of these have in fact already been released via the now-defunct Warner Premiere.

Accordingly, the streaming rights to Peanuts media are scattered across multiple platforms. Apple TV holds the specials (with Warner Bros. Domestic Television Distribution and WildBrain Distribution still holding the current streaming and home media rights with Apple) and PBS had the free-to-air TV rights to select specials around 2020 to 2021, The Peanuts Movie'', distributed by 20th Century Fox, became part of The Walt Disney Company library and is on Disney+.

See also

 Peanuts filmography

External Links 
Checklist

References

Film series introduced in 1965
 
Animated specials